Paul Killeen (born 24 June 1994) is an Irish hurler who plays as a right corner-back for club side Tynagh-Abbey/Duniry and at inter-county level with the Galway senior hurling team.

Playing career

College

Killeen first came to prominence as a hurler with Portumna Community School. After playing in every grade of hurling during his tenure there, he eventually played in the Connacht Championship with the senior team.

University

As a student at the Limerick Institute of Technology, Killeen was a regular player on the university's senior hurling team in the Fitzgibbon Cup.

Club

Killeen joined the Tynagh-Abbey/Duniry club at a young age and played in all grades at juvenile and underage levels before joining the club's top adult team.

Inter-county

Minor and under-21

Killeen first played for Galway as a member of the minor hurling team on 23 July 2011. He made his first appearance in an 8–26 to 0-12 All-Ireland quarter-final defeat of Antrim at Parnell Park. On 4 September 2011, Killeen was at full-back for Galway's 1–21 to 1–12 defeat of Dublin in the All-Ireland final at Croke Park.

Killeen was appointed captain of the Galway minor team in his second and final season. On 19 August 2012, he was red-carded in the 45th minute of an All-Ireland semi-final meeting with Tipperary.	

As a member of the Galway under-21 hurling team, Killeen made his first appearance on 24 August 2013 in a 1–16 to 0-07 All-Ireland semi-final defeat by Clare.

Senior

Killeen made his debut for the Galway senior team on 9 March 2014 in a 2–16 to 1-16 National Hurling League defeat by Kilkenny. He later made his first championship start on 1 June 2014 in a 1–22 to 0–23 defeat of Laois.

On 6 September 2015, Killeen was an unused substitute for Galway's 1–22 to 1–18 defeat by Kilkenny in the All-Ireland final.

On 23 April 2017, Killeen was at left corner-back when Galway defeated Tipperary by 3–21 to 0–14 to win the National Hurling League. In Galway's opening Leinster Championship against Dublin on 28 May 2017, Killeen suffered a cruciate knee injury while ended his season.

On 8 July 2018, Killeen won a Leinster Championship medal following Galway's 1–28 to 3–15 defeat of Kilkenny in the final replay. In the subsequent All-Ireland final against Limerick on 19 August, Killeen started the game on the bench but was introduced as a replacement for John Hanbury. Galway were beaten by 3–16 to 2–18.

Career statistics

Honours

Galway
Leinster Senior Hurling Championship (2): 2017, 2018
National Hurling League Division 1 (1): 2017
All-Ireland Minor Hurling Championship (1): 2011

References

1994 births
Living people
Tynagh-Abbey/Duniry hurlers
Galway inter-county hurlers